The Eungella shadeskink (Saproscincus eungellensis) is a species of skink found in Queensland in Australia.

References

Saproscincus
Reptiles described in 2005
Skinks of Australia
Endemic fauna of Australia
Taxa named by Ross Allen Sadlier
Taxa named by Patrick J. Couper
Taxa named by Donald J. Colgan
Taxa named by Eric P. Vanderduys